Events from the year 1773 in Denmark.

Incumbents
 Monarch – Christian VII
 Prime minister – Ove Høegh-Guldberg

Events

Undated

Births
 9 January – Carl Emil Moltke, diplomat and landowner (died 1858)

Deaths
 21 April – Jens Høysgaard, philologist (died 1698)
 Catarina Gustmeyer, businessperson

References

 
1770s in Denmark
Denmark
Years of the 18th century in Denmark